The 1891–92 Scottish Cup was the 19th season of Scotland's most prestigious football knockout competition. The Cup was won by Celtic when they beat Queen's Park 5–1 in the final after a replay.

Calendar

Fifth round

 Match Abandoned

Fifth round replay

Sixth round

Sixth round replay

Sixth round second replay

Quarter-final

Quarter-final replay

Quarter-final second replay

Semi-finals

Semi-final replay

Final

Match declared void due to repeated crowd encroachment.

Final replay

Teams

See also
 1891–92 in Scottish football

References

RSSF Scottish Cup 91-92

1891-1892
Cup
Cup